Myth is the twelfth studio album created by the music production company Two Steps from Hell, released on May 3, 2022. 

It comprises 21 tracks plus one bonus track, all written by composers Thomas J. Bergersen and Nick Phoenix, and features vocal performances by Merethe Soltvedt, Felicia Farerre, Tina Guo, Ajša Kadrić and Úyanga Bold.

Track listing

Charts

References

External links

2022 albums
Two Steps from Hell albums